Ferdinand Břetislav Mikovec (14 December 1826, Sloup v Čechách – 22 September 1862, Prague) was a Czech writer, publisher, historian, theatre critic and nationalist.

Life and work
His father was the administrator of a manor house, and died while Ferdinand was still very young. After attending primary school in Česká Lípa, he went to Prague in 1842, to study philosophy. Later, he studied art and art history at Charles University.

Although he had been raised in a German-speaking environment, he became interested in Czech history and the Czech National Revival. In 1848, he was deeply involved in the Revolution and was forced to flee to Zagreb when it was suppressed. When it was safe to travel, he went to Leipzig, where he studied the life of Jan Hus.

In 1851, he was able to return to Prague and established the literary magazine, Lumír. He would occasionally provide copies of works by Czech artists to his readers, as a bonus. He also contributed to the completion of St. Vitus Cathedral, published a monograph on Karlštejn castle, and initiated the creation of an art and literary association known as "Arkadia". He became its first Chairman and organized an exhibition of Czech art, which took place in 1861. Today, he is largely remembered for his efforts to establish a Czech national theatre; writing criticism and dramas and serving on the committee for the construction of the National Theatre. 

He suffered from a congenital heart defect, which worsened in 1862. His mother came to help nurse him through his illness, but he died of it a few months later. A major work on Czech monuments was left unfinished.  In 1911, when the cemetery where he was interred was demolished, his remains were returned to his hometown.

Sources

External links

Works by and about Mikovec @ the National Library of the Czech Republic

1826 births
1862 deaths
Czech writers
Czech publishers (people)
Czech nationalists
Czech dramatists and playwrights
Czech art historians
People from Česká Lípa District
Charles University alumni